Büyükdere is a Turkish word meaning "big creek" and may refer to:

Places
 Büyükdere, Hasankeyf, a village in the Hasankeyf district of Batman Province, Turkey 
 Büyükdere, Koçarlı, a village in the Koçarlı district of Aydın Province, Turkey 
 Büyükdere, Pasinler
 Büyükdere, Pazaryolu
 Büyükdere, Sarıyer, a quarter of Sarıyer district in Istanbul Province, Turkey 
 Büyükdere Avenue, a major street in the European part of Istanbul, Turkey

Other uses
 TCG Büyükdere (P-128), a former minesweeper of the Turkish Navy